The 2015 CAF Confederation Cup qualifying rounds were played from 13 February to 3 May 2015. A total of 63 teams competed in the qualifying rounds to decide the eight places in the group stage of the 2015 CAF Confederation Cup.

Draw
The draw for the preliminary, first and second qualifying rounds was held on 22 December 2014 at the CAF headquarters in Cairo, Egypt. The entry round of each team was determined by their ranking points calculated based on performances in continental club championships for the period 2010–2014.

The following 55 teams were entered into the draw:

Format
Qualification ties were played on a home-and-away two-legged basis. If the aggregate score was tied after the second leg, the away goals rule would be applied, and if still level, the penalty shoot-out would be used to determine the winner (no extra time would be played).

Schedule
The schedule of each round was as follows.

Bracket
The eight winners of the second round advanced to the play-off round, where they were joined by the eight losers of the Champions League second round.

Preliminary round
The preliminary round included the 46 teams that did not receive byes to the first round.

|}

Sahel SC won 2–0 on aggregate.

2–2 on aggregate. Onze Créateurs won on away goals.

Al-Ittihad won 7–1 on aggregate.

Petrojet won 7–1 on aggregate.

Olympique de Ngor won 3–2 on aggregate.

Hearts of Oak won 1–0 on aggregate.

ASO Chlef won 2–1 on aggregate.

Horoya won 4–3 on aggregate.

1–1 on aggregate. Dolphins won on penalties.

Dedebit won 5–2 on aggregate.

Warri Wolves won 4–0 on aggregate.

MK Étanchéité won 3–2 on aggregate.

Rayon Sports won 2–0 on aggregate.

AS Togo-Port won 5–3 on aggregate.

Power Dynamos won 2–1 on aggregate.

CF Mounana won 8–1 on aggregate.

URA won 4–2 on aggregate.

FC Platinum won 4–2 on aggregate.

Young Africans won 3–2 on aggregate.

Benfica de Luanda won 3–0 on aggregate.

Petro de Luanda won 5–0 on aggregate.

3–3 on aggregate. Royal Leopards won on penalties.

Ferroviário da Beira won 7–3 on aggregate.

First round
The first round included 32 teams: the 23 winners of the preliminary round, and the 9 teams that received byes to this round.

|}

Onze Créateurs won 2–1 on aggregate.

ASEC Mimosas won 2–1 on aggregate.

Djoliba won 2–1 on aggregate.

Hearts of Oak won 5–3 on aggregate.

1–1 on aggregate. ASO Chlef won on penalties.

Club Africain won on walkover after Dolphins did not arrive on time for the first leg.

Warri Wolves won 2–0 on aggregate.

MK Étanchéité won 6–3 on aggregate.

Zamalek won 6–1 on aggregate.

FUS Rabat won 4–2 on aggregate.

CF Mounana won 4–3 on aggregate.

Orlando Pirates won 4–3 on aggregate.

Young Africans won 5–2 on aggregate.

Étoile du Sahel won 2–1 on aggregate.

Royal Leopards won 3–2 on aggregate.

AS Vita Club won 3–1 on aggregate.

Second round
The second round included the 16 winners of the first round.

|}

ASEC Mimosas won 3–0 on aggregate.

2–2 on aggregate. Hearts of Oak won on away goals.

Club Africain won 2–1 on aggregate.

Warri Wolves won 3–1 on aggregate.

Zamalek won 3–2 on aggregate.

Orlando Pirates won 5–2 on aggregate.

Étoile du Sahel won 2–1 on aggregate.

AS Vita Club won 4–2 on aggregate.

Play-off round
The play-off round included 16 teams: the eight winners of the Confederation Cup second round and the eight losers of the Champions League second round.

The draw for the play-off round was held on 5 May 2015, 11:00 UTC+2, at the CAF Headquarters in Cairo, Egypt. The winners of the Confederation Cup second round were drawn against the losers of the Champions League second round, with the former hosting the second leg. Four ties contained a seeded loser of the Champions League second round (Pot A) and an unseeded winner of the Confederation Cup second round (Pot B), and the other four ties contained a seeded winner of the Confederation Cup second round (Pot C) and an unseeded loser of the Champions League second round (Pot D). The seeding of each team was determined by their ranking points calculated based on performances in continental club championships for the period 2010–2014.

The following 16 teams were entered into the draw:

The eight winners of the play-off round advanced to the group stage.

|}

3–3 on aggregate. Al-Ahly won on penalties (advanced to Group A).

Espérance de Tunis won 5–1 on aggregate (advanced to Group A).

AC Léopards won 4–3 on aggregate (advanced to Group B).

CS Sfaxien won 3–1 on aggregate (advanced to Group B).

Stade Malien won 4–3 on aggregate (advanced to Group A).

Orlando Pirates won 6–1 on aggregate (advanced to Group B).

Zamalek won 3–2 on aggregate (advanced to Group B).

Étoile du Sahel won 3–2 on aggregate (advanced to Group A).

References

External links
Orange CAF Confederation Cup 2015, CAFonline.com

1